SK-5 may refer to

Casio SK-5, a sampling machine
Bell SK-5, a licence built version of the SR.N5 hovercraft